Qezel Qayah (also Romanized as Qezel Qayeh) is a village in Hir Rural District, in the Hir District of Ardabil County, Ardabil Province, Iran. At the 2006 census, its population was 1,095 in 217 families.

References 

Towns and villages in Ardabil County